Carrubbers Christian Centre is a church on the Royal Mile in Edinburgh, Scotland.

History
Carrubbers Close Mission was founded in 1858 and its 'workers' originally met in a former Atheist Meeting House in Carrubbers Close. The Rev. James Gall (1808–1895) was the founder of the  Mission. In 1883 the American evangelist Dwight L. Moody came to Edinburgh. He was accompanied by Ira D. Sankey who sang his self-composed songs while Moody preached. During their visit, they managed to raise £10,000 to pay for a permanent home for the mission and later that year, the foundation stone was laid. The building was designed by the Edinburgh architect, John Armstrong.

As a mission rather than a church, Carrubbers has supported other Edinburgh churches in teaching and outreach. Run by a board of directors representing other churches of various denominations throughout the city, Carrubbers has concentrated through most of its history on evangelism, Bible teaching and alleviating suffering amongst the poor, the ill and those prone to addiction.  Saturday night rallies have been a feature of the Carrubbers ministry and the Free Breakfast for the homeless every Sunday morning of the year is still a feature of Carrubbers life.

Carrubbers transformed
In the 1980s, with large scale rallies becoming culturally less popular, and with an ageing building, the directors decided to refurbish the fabric of the building. The project was named, "Carrubbers into the nineties." In 1990, work began and a floor was inserted at balcony level. This created an inviting main hall capable of seating 350 people. In the new basement, a café was built along with lower halls and office space. Upstairs from the main hall are further halls and office space along with a library and a private flat.

The focus moved to building a small congregation as an independent, non-denominational church.  Carrubbers main meetings are now on Sundays at 9:45am, 11:30am and 6:30pm with a range of over 30 different activities and ministries including home groups on the second and fourth Tuesdays of each month, with church prayer meetings on other Tuesdays. Carrubbers Christian Centre attracts many students and young people and is known for its expository Bible preaching and a range of courses to train and equip Christians. In addition, many find faith in Jesus through contact with its members or through its courses for enquirers or outreach enterprises.

References

External links
 Carrubbers Christian Centre website

Churches in Edinburgh
Royal Mile
Category B listed buildings in Edinburgh
Listed churches in Edinburgh
Christian charities based in Scotland